The Eufaula Millers were a Minor League Baseball team based in Eufaula, Alabama, that played in the Alabama–Florida League in 1952 and 1953.  A previous minor league team from Eufaula played in the Dixie League in 1916–1917.

References

External links
Baseball Reference

Baseball teams established in 1952
Baseball teams disestablished in 1953
Defunct minor league baseball teams
Professional baseball teams in Alabama
Defunct Alabama-Florida League teams
1952 establishments in Alabama
1953 disestablishments in Alabama
Barbour County, Alabama
Defunct baseball teams in Alabama